MyState Limited is an Australian financial group,  headquartered in Hobart, Tasmania. It formed in 2009 following the merger of the Tasmanian Perpetual Trustees and MyState Financial. In 2011 it further purchased the Queensland-based Rock Building Society for $68.3 million AUD. In October 2014, its largest section, MyState Financial received authorisation from the Australian Prudential Regulation Authority to rename itself to MyState Bank.

Companies
MyState Limited consists of 
 MyState Bank (including The Rock – A division of MyState Bank, and the MyState     Foundation)  
 Tasmanian Perpetual Trustees

History
MyState was founded as a Credit Union in Tasmania, Australia under the name Connect Credit Union, which was created from the merging of two credit unions, the Teachers, Police and Nurses Credit Union and Savings & Loans (Credit Union Cooperartive).

Connect Credit Union attempted to demutualise in 2003 but failed when just 13,000 of its members voted, unable to reach a quorum of 75% of members voting.

In 2007 the members of Tasmania's two largest credit unions agreed to a merger, creating MyState Credit Union out of Island State Credit Union and Connect Credit Union. In 2009 MyState Credit Union merged with Tasmanian Perpetual Trustees, demutualising at the same time to list on the ASX.

In 2011, MyState purchased The Rock Building Society which had been established in the Central Queensland city of Rockhampton in 1967. Following the merger, MyState closed multiple branches of The Rock throughout the region including in Emerald, Biloela, Mount Morgan, Moura, Emu Park and Baralaba.

Despite the new ownership, The Rock Building Society retained its original name until its branches were rebranded in 2018 to MyState Bank.   The Rock's regional executive manager Peter Fraser assured customers that despite the name change there would be no negatives associated with the rebrand such as branch closures or staff losses.

However, less than two years later, MyState announced all remaining Central Queensland branches of MyState Bank would close, with 26 staff in Rockhampton, Gladstone and Yeppoon losing their jobs.  MyState bank claimed the decision was made due to the declining number of customers who visited branches in person, as well as the decrease in the use of cash during the COVID-19 pandemic.

The decision drew strong criticism from Rockhampton Regional Council mayor, Margaret Strelow who said she was "disgusted" by the decision and that she and her husband would be withdrawing their money from MyState Bank in protest.  Strelow said it was "a timely reminder of the arrogance which we are treated when our businesses are taken over by large entities".

References

ABC news story
ABC
Tasmanian Times on merger
Tasmanian Government
ABC
Sunday Tasmanian *Examiner
Focus of a co-op case study
ABC Stateline
ZDNet.

External links

 Official Website
 Corporate Website

Companies based in Hobart
Credit unions of Australia
Banks of Tasmania
Banks of Australia